François Fortunat Rouleau (July 4, 1849 – December 16, 1907) was a lawyer and political figure in Quebec. He represented Dorchester in the House of Commons of Canada from 1874 to 1882 as a Liberal-Conservative member.

He was born in Sainte-Claire, Canada East, the son of François Rouleau and Luce Labonté, was educated at the Laval Normal School and the Université Laval, and was called to the Quebec bar in 1870. Rouleau practised law in Quebec City. In 1878, he married J.J. Alphonsine Peachy. His election in 1874 was overturned after an appeal but he won the subsequent by-election in 1875. Rouleau served as clerk assistant of the House of Commons from 1882 to 1897. He was an unsuccessful candidate for a seat in the House of Commons in 1900. Rouleau died in Sainte-Claire at the age of 58.

References 

1849 births
1907 deaths
Members of the House of Commons of Canada from Quebec
Conservative Party of Canada (1867–1942) MPs